The 1982 United States Senate election in Mississippi was held on November 2, 1982. Incumbent Democratic U.S. Senator John C. Stennis won re-election to his seventh term.

Major candidates

Democratic 
John C. Stennis, U.S. Senator since 1947
 Charles Pittman, Mississippi State Senator since 1980

Republican 
Haley Barbour, political operative who campaigned for U.S. Presidents Richard Nixon and Gerald Ford

Results

See also 
 1982 United States Senate elections

References 

1982
Mississippi
1982 Mississippi elections